Daniel Kelly (born 1947 in Idaho Falls, Idaho) is an American artist based in Kyoto, Japan.  Works primarily consist of original paintings and prints.  Paintings usually begin with three-dimensional collage making incorporating materials that can be found in Japan such as tatami and bamboo mats.  In printmaking Kelly primarily works with lithography and woodblock, often using chine-collé to incorporate materials such as antique Japanese book pages, ukiyo-e and calligraphy into his prints.

Museums and collections 
A selection of prints by Daniel Kelly included in public collections:

Children's Parade (1982). Woodblock. 16.9 cm x 72 cm. Metropolitan Museum of Art, NY, NY.
Shimmer (1982).  Woodblock.  29.2 cm x 76.3 cm.  British Museum, London.
Buttercups (1983). Woodblock. 17.5 cm x 70.5 cm. Metropolitan Museum of Art, NY, NY; British Museum, London.
Spring Shower (1983). Woodblock. 10.5 cm x 76.5 cm.  British Museum, London.
Blaine (1985). Lithograph. 48 cm x 78 cm. Museum of Modern Art, NY, NY; New York Public Library; Brooklyn Museum.
Letter From Japan (1985). Lithograph, chine-collé. 50 cm x 100 cm. Metropolitan Museum of Art, NY, NY.
Crisscross (1985).  Lithograph.  65 cm x 98 cm.  British Museum, London.
Night Light (1987). Lithograph, chine-collé.  62 cm x 80 cm. Smithsonian American Art Museum, Washington, DC.
Shiga's Underwear (1989).  Lithograph, woodblock, chine-collé.  63 cm x 98 cm.  Art Gallery of New South Wales, Sydney, Australia.
Black Gold (1990). Lithograph. 54 cm x 64 cm.  Cleveland Museum of Art, Cleveland, OH.
October (1997). Woodblock print with hand-coloring on paper.  154.8 cm x 205 cm. Freer Gallery of Art, Washington, DC.
Nene (2002).  Woodblock.  Cleveland Museum of Art, Cleveland, OH.
Momo (2003).  Woodblock, chine-collé.  70.5 cm x 109 cm.  Los Angeles County Museum of Art, Los Angeles, CA.

References

External links 
 Daniel Kelly Studio
 Article by Jane Singer, The Japan Times, December 4, 2010
 Article by Vivienne Kenrick, The Japan Times, October 20, 2001
 Article by Grace Glueck, The New York Times, March 22, 1985

20th-century American painters
American male painters
21st-century American painters
21st-century American male artists
1947 births
Living people
20th-century American printmakers
People from Idaho Falls, Idaho
20th-century American male artists